David Labiosa (born October 4, 1961) is an American actor who had various television appearances. He was in such shows as The Powers of Matthew Star, Silk Stalkings, Diagnosis Murder, NYPD Blue, CSI: Miami, and JAG.

In 1981, Labiosa starred in the horror film, The Entity as Billy, the son of Carla Moran.

Labiosa had a role in the 1988 season of CBS Schoolbreak in the episode Gangs where he starred as former gang member turns Army soldier Anthony Rojas.

Labiosa's most recognizable role was as the fired busboy in the Seinfeld episode "The Busboy", aired in 1991: Labiosa plays Antonio, who was fired after George Costanza and Elaine Benes lightly criticised him for leaving a menu to light on fire. George and Kramer go to apologize to the intimidating and muscular Antonio. In the end, Antonio is grateful for getting fired because the restaurant exploded the next day. To wrap the show up, Antonio fights with Elaine's boyfriend.

In 2003, Labiosa played the role David Gomez, an associate of the Salazar narco-terrorist network in season 3 of the Fox series 24.

References

External links

Living people
American male television actors
1961 births